Kisku may refer to:

Amiya Kumar Kisku (1923–?), Indian politician
Choton Kisku, Indian politician
Jadunath Kisku (1923–1985), Indian politician
Jamadar Kisku (born 1949), Indian writer of Santali language from West Bengal
Prithvi Chand Kisku (1927–2011), Indian politician
Rathin Kisku (born 1984), Indian singer
Sarada Prasad Kisku (1929–1996), Santhali writer and educator

Indian surnames